Scada karschina is a species of clearwing (ithomiine) butterflies in the family Nymphalidae, native to Brazil.

Description
Upperside. Antennae black. Head black, with small white spots. Neck orange. Thorax black, with grey marks. Abdomen black at top, and grey on the sides. Wings yellowish white, verged and tipped with black, without any marks or spots on them.

Underside. Palpi and breast grey. Legs black. Abdomen white. Anus yellowish. Wings coloured as on the upper side. Wingspan 2 inches (50 mm).

Subspecies
Scada karschina karschina
Scada karschina delicata Talbot, 1932

References

Ithomiini
Nymphalidae of South America
Butterflies described in 1792
Taxa named by Johann Friedrich Wilhelm Herbst